Groupama an abbreviation for Groupe des Assurances Mutuelles Agricoles is a French insurance group headquartered in Paris with operations in 10 countries.

It is listed in the 2007 ICA Global 300 list of mutuals and co-operatives, ranked 6th by 2005 turnover, making it the 2nd largest mutual insurer in the world.

History
The predecessor of Groupama was founded in the 19th century by a group of farmers to address their own specific insurance needs.  It was set up as a mutual organisation and focused on agricultural as well as individuals, professionals, local authorities and businesses.

History:
 December 22, 1840 establishment of the first local agricultural mutual fire Insurer by farmers in Mions (Rhône)
 1900 A new law is passed on July 4 that sets the specific legal framework for Agricultural Mutual Insurance Funds.
 Establishment of a central fund for the agricultural reinsurance "Fire" (1906) and "Livestock" (1908)
 1963 Creation of Samda for risk protection of non-agricultural damage.
 1972 Creation of SORAVIE (Society of Agricultural Organizations Life Insurance), in partnership with Crédit Agricole
 1975 Creation of SOS-AMA (generalized assistance)
 1986 AMA Samda, SORAVIE, SOREMA are merged under the new name Groupama
 1992 Creating B.CERP bank, which took the name of Groupama Financial Bank
 1998 Groupama acquires GAN the 4th largest French insurer at that time making Groupama the second largest French general insurer
 1999 The acquired GAN business hit by large claims from exceptional storms and floods at the end of 1999
 2001 Groupama expand its banking services continues to expand its insurance business in France and other countries through acquisitions
 2009 Acquired Banque Finama which is merged with Groupama bank
 2011 The company get into financial In difficulties and sells a number of subsidiaries in 2011 early 2012 to stay afloat. On 5 October 2012, Groupama announced that it exercises its option not to pay interest on a portion of its debt by the deadline of October 22. According to the group, it is not a default, but a part of the outstanding action plan initiated in early 2012.

Subsidiaries 

Groupama is present in 10 countries, mainly in Europe (France, Italy, Hungary, Romania, Greece, Bulgaria, Slovakia), in Turkey, in Tunisia and in China.

See also

List of investors in Bernard L. Madoff Securities
 Groupama Arena, a stadium in Budapest, Hungary that bears the company's name via a sponsorship deal
 Parc Olympique Lyonnais, a stadium near Lyon, France also known as Groupama Stadium through a sponsorship deal with this company

References

External links
 Official site

Financial services companies established in 1986
Insurance companies of France
Privatized companies of France
French brands